Injapur is a village in Rangareddy district in Telangana, India. It falls under Abdullapurmet mandal and administration under Turkayamjal Municipality. It is 9 km from the Outer Ring Road, Hyderabad.

References

Villages in Ranga Reddy district